The Rascal of Madrid (Spanish:El pilluelo de Madrid) is a 1926 Spanish silent film directed by Florián Rey.

Cast
 Guillermo Figueras
 Alfredo Hurtado   
 Pedro Larrañaga
 Manuel Montenegro  
 Ricardo Núñez  
 Ricardo Piroto   
 Flora Rossini  
 Elisa Ruiz Romero

References

Bibliography
 Hortelano, Lorenzo J. Torres. World Film Locations: Madrid''. Intellect Books, 2012.

External links 

1926 films
Spanish silent films
1920s Spanish-language films
Films directed by Florián Rey
Films set in Madrid
Spanish black-and-white films